Celina is a city in Collin and Denton counties in the U.S. state of Texas. Celina is part of the Dallas–Fort Worth metroplex and is nestled between the major arteries of Texas State Highway 289 (Preston Road) to the east and the future Dallas North Tollway to the west; Celina is approximately 40 miles north of Dallas.

According to the 2020 U.S. census, the population of Celina was 16,739. The Dallas Business Journal has ranked Celina as the fastest-growing city in the Dallas–Fort Worth metroplex for three consecutive years (2019-2021). The population growth rate of Celina was 50.8% from 2015 to 2019. Celina's maximum project buildout population is approximately 378,000.

Celina is the 1st gigabit city in the State of Texas and was recognized by Texas Governor Greg Abbott in May 2022. In 2017, Celina passed a gigabit city ordinance, which was an innovative initiative to provide fiber, gigabit internet sped to all of its residential homes. As of 2021, approximately 9,300 homes have high speed fiber internet, and residents have pure fiber network with unlimited bandwidth and speeds of 1,000 megabits per second.

History
Although Celina was not established until 1876, settlers came into the area at a much earlier date. A Methodist church was built in 1880, and it doubled as a schoolhouse for a short time. Celina's first postmaster John T. Mulkey renamed the town after his hometown – Celina, Tennessee. By 1884, Celina a gristmill, cotton gin, school, several general stores, and a drug store that has been opened in “Old Celina.”

In 1902, news had reached Celina that the St. Louis, San Francisco, and Texas Railway would be constructed and extended to reach the area. Shortly thereafter, the merchants of the town made the decision to move the entire town closer to the railway. The town coined itself “Rollertown.” The move was completed in February 1902.

A town site company secured land for the new “Celina,” which was part of a pasture belonging to the late William Willock. The company had taken fences down, marked off streets, and placed lots for sale. Originally, it was intended that the current Main Street would be the Main Street of the town so it was made wider than the other streets and the price of lots were higher. Because of the higher price, the merchants began locating north of Main Street and west of the railroad. In 1907, the town was officially incorporated with Will Newsom serving as the first mayor.

In 1910, Celina resident J. Fred Smith (who later became the first mayor of University Park in Dallas) had the business section rebuilt from a row of frame buildings facing the railroad tracks to uniform brick buildings around a square. By July 1911, Smith's effort had paid off as several new buildings were ready for use and gravel streets were constructed, which gave Celina the appearance of a wide-awake, growing little city. Businesses began to relocate from their wooden structures into the new brick buildings, and many of the wooden structures moved into a residential section and transformed into homes. This was a pivotal moment in Celina's character as it marked the shift towards the brick features that define the Downtown Square today.

Celina Pike, the first road in the county built exclusively for automobiles, opened in Celina in 1915. At that time, Celina had a newspaper, two banks, and municipal water works. In 1921, Lone Star Gas organized Farmers Gas Company to provide natural gas to Celina and other small rural towns. In 1924, Texas Power and Light began supplying electricity to Celina then replaced by Grayson-Collin Electric Cooperative in 1937.

By 1937, Celina had a variety of businesses and professional services, including a dry good store, seven gas stations, three cotton gins, two drug stores, two grain elevators, two ice houses, flour mill, laundry, lumber yard, shoe and harness shop, jewelry store, blacksmith, movie theatre, and a modern brick school building. During World War II, the diversification of commerce in the Downtown Square continued as it served as a collection points for scrap iron.

An excerpt from the Celina Record in 1937 states:
If you are casting about for a good place to make your home you should visit Celina and see for yourself what it has to offer. Some here occasionally say the grass is greener elsewhere and move away, but most of them decide there is no use trying to find a better place in which to live and rear their families, come back, and settle down firmly fixed in their belief that trying is a waste of time.

Fast forward to 2000, there were 135 businesses and 1,861 residents residing in Celina. Today, the Historic Downtown Square still houses a number of the original buildings that are either adjacent or around the Square from over a century ago. These original structures serve as an excellent representation of the historic charm of Celina. The Huddleston Building, which is located on the Downtown Square, is an example of how a building can be modernized while also retaining the historic, rural feel. This renovation project received the “Best New Construction in Cities under 50,000 Award” from the Texas Downtown Association.

Geography
Celina is located in Collin County and Denton County. Celina is centered mostly on State Highway 289 with its downtown located west of the state highway. The Dallas North Tollway will be located to the west of the city.

Climate
The climate in this area is characterized by hot, humid summers and generally mild to cool winters. According to the Koppen Climate Classification System, Celina has a humid subtropical climate, abbreviated “Cfa” on climate maps.

Demographics

The population of Celina was 150 in 1884, but declined to 50 by 1892. The first year that the U.S. Census Bureau counted the population of Celina came in 1910 with 724. By 1920, Celina had grown to 1,126 residents, but declined to 994 in 1940. Celina has grown steadily after World War II until the significant population increase beginning in 2010. According to the 2020 U.S. census, there were 16,739 people, 4,675 households, and 3,927 families residing in the city.

Among the population, its population density was 17.4 people per square mile. In the 4,675 households, 79.3% were married couples living together, 2.5% had a male householder, 12.7% had a female householder, and 5.5% were non-families. The average persons per household size was 3.3. In the city, the breakdown of age consisted of 33.8% (19 and under), 8.2% (20 to 29), 17.3% (30 to 39), 15.3% (40 to 49), 10.2% (50 to 59), and 15.7% (60 or older). The median age was 34.8 years, and 37 years as of 2022. The ratio of male to female reported as exactly 50% males and 50% females.

Celina's racial and ethnic makeup as of 2020 was 65.92% non-Hispanic white, 7.34% Black or African American, 0.5% Native American, 3.41% Asian, 0.07% Pacific Islander, 0.34% some other race, 4.97% multiracial, and 17.46% Hispanic or Latino American of any race. Its growing non-White American population has been attributed to nationwide demographic trends of greater diversification.

Education
Most of the city is in Celina Independent School District while the southern portions are in Prosper Independent School District.

Schools operated by Celina ISD include Celina High School, Celina Middle School – West Wing, Celina Middle School – East Wing, Celina Primary School, Lykins Elementary School, and O’Dell Elementary School. Schools operated by Prosper ISD include Boyer Elementary School, Johnson Elementary School and Light Farms Elementary School.

The Texas Legislature designated Collin College as the community college for all of Collin County for Celina ISD, in addition to some other parts of Denton County. Most parts of Denton County, including the Prosper ISD part of Celina, are in the zone for North Central Texas College. Collin College – Celina Campus officially opened in Fall 2021.

In Celina, 48% of the population has a degree in higher education (Bachelor's degree, Master's degree, Post-Graduate Degree) while 28% has some college education, 20% has a high school degree, and 4% has no degree.

Government

Local Government
Celina is a “Home-Rule Municipality,” governed by a Mayor and City Council who are elected by the residents. Since its establishment in 1876, Celina residents have elected representatives to achieve City goals and enhance quality of life. Acting together, the Mayor and City Council adopt all ordinances and resolutions and determine the general goals and policies for the city. The city's mission of preserving its agricultural heritage, providing excellent public safety, and an extraordinary quality of life are all key facts in each decision.

City Council Members
 Sean Terry, Mayor
 Jay Pierce, Mayor Pro Tem, Place 2
 Wendie Wigginton, Deputy Pro Tem, Place 4
 Philip Ferguson, Place 1
 Andy Hopkins, Place 3
 Mindy Koehne, Place 5
 Tony Griggs, Place 6
 Jason Laumer, City Manager

State Government
After the 2021 state and federal redistricting, Celina is located in the 66th and 106th Districts in the Texas State House of Representatives. The representatives for Celina are Matt Shaheen (66th District, Collin County) and Jared Patterson (106th District, Denton County). Celina is located in the Texas State Senate in the 8th District and is represented by State Senator Angela Paxton.

Federal Government
After the 2021 state and federal redistricting, Celina is located in the United States Congressional District 4. Pat Fallon has been the U.S. Representative for Texas's 4th Congressional District since 2021.

Special events 
Celina is known for hosting events that brings the community together. Each year, Celina hosts over 25 events with the majority of them occurring on the Historic Downtown Square. The city hosts four main events: Cajun Fest (May), Splash & Blast (July), Beware! Of the Square (October), Christmas on the Square (November). In addition, the city hosts Friday Night Markets once a month from March to November.

Celina was designated as the “Halloween Capital of North Texas” by Collin County Judge Chris Hill in August 2021.

Notable people
 Craig James, sportscaster and 2012 U.S. Senate candidate
 Ryan Merritt, Major League Baseball pitcher and former Celina Bobcat

References

External links

 City of Celina official website
 Greater Celina Chamber of Commerce

Cities in Collin County, Texas
Cities in Texas
Dallas–Fort Worth metroplex
Cities in Denton County, Texas